Maurice Brooks (1823 – 6 December 1905) was an Irish Home Rule League politician, and woman's suffragist.

He was elected Home Rule Member of Parliament (MP) for Dublin City in 1874, and remained MP until the seat was abolished in 1885.

In February 1871, at the end of a woman's suffrage tour of Ireland undertaken by Isabella Tod, Brooks attended the formation in Dublin of a committee (which he regularly attended with the Orangeman and unionist MP for Belfast, William Johnston) from which emerged the Dublin Women's Suffrage Association. At Westminster he regularly presented the Association's suffrage petitions.

Brooks was Lord Mayor of Dublin for 1874.

Arms

References

External links
 

UK MPs 1874–1880
UK MPs 1880–1885
1823 births
1905 deaths
Home Rule League MPs
Members of the Parliament of the United Kingdom for County Dublin constituencies (1801–1922)